The 2015 Alabama Crimson Tide baseball team represents the University of Alabama in the 2015 NCAA Division I baseball season. The Crimson Tide played their home games at the Hoover Metropolitan Stadium in Hoover due to renovations at their normal on-campus home of Sewell–Thomas Stadium.

Personnel

Returning starters

Roster

Coaching staff

Schedule and results

! colspan=2 style="background:#FFF;color:#8b0000;" | Regular Season
|- valign="top" 

|- bgcolor="#ccffcc"
| February 13 ||  ||  ||Hoover Met || 6–0 || T. Guilbeau (1–0) || J. Stinnett (0–1) || R. Castillo (1) ||  2,535 || 1–0 || –
|- bgcolor="#ccffcc"
| February 14 || UMES ||  ||Hoover Met || 11–0 || W. Carter (1–0) ||J. Bone (0–1) || None ||  2,783 || 2–0 ||–
|- bgcolor="#ccffcc"
| February 15 || UMES  ||  || Hoover Met || 19–0 || G. Bramblett (1–0) ||T. Whiteman (0–1) || None ||2,410 || 3–0 ||–
|- bgcolor="#ffbbbb"
| February 20 || at #6 Houston|| #30|| Cougar Field || 1–3 || A. Lantrip (2–0) || T. Guilbeau (1–1) || S. Romero (2) ||  1,989 || 3–1 || –
|- bgcolor="#ffbbbb"
| February 21 || at #6 Houston|| #30|| Cougar Field ||  9–14 || B. Maxwell (2–0) || T. Burrows (0–1) || None ||  2,463 || 3–2 || –
|- bgcolor="#ccffcc"
| February 22 || at #6 Houston||#30 || Cougar Field ||8–3 || G. Bramblett (2–0) ||A. Garza (0–1) || R. Castillo (2)  ||1,883 || 4–2 ||–
|- bgcolor="#ccffcc"
| February 24 || ||  || Hoover Met || 7–2 || J. Walters (1–0) ||R. Doyle (0–1) || None  ||2,500 || 5–2 ||–
|- bgcolor="#ccffcc"
| February 24 || Savannah State||  || Hoover Met ||  4–2 || J. Hubbard (1–0) ||G. Hollman (0–1) || J. Wilhite (1)  ||2,232 || 4–2 ||–
|- bgcolor="#ccffcc"
| February 27 || ||  ||Hoover Met ||  6–4 || R. Castillo (1–0) ||W. Bacon (0–1) || None  ||2,343 || 5–2 ||–
|- bgcolor="#ffbbbb"
| February 28 || Louisiana–Lafayette||  || Hoover Met || 5–6 || R. Cooper (2–0) ||T. Burrows (0–2) || C. Lee (2) ||2,863 || 6–2 ||–
|-

|- bgcolor="#ffbbbb"
| March 1|| Louisiana–Lafayette || ||Hoover Met ||  2–14 || G. Leger (2–0) ||G. Bramblett (2–1) || None ||2,738 || 7–4 ||–
|- bgcolor="#ffbbbb"
| March 3† ||  || ||Riverwalk Stadium || 3–5 || K. Thompson (3–1) ||J. Hubbard (1–1) || T. Wingenter (1) ||6,219 || 7–5 ||–
|- bgcolor="#ccffcc"
| March 6 ||  || ||Hank Aaron Stadium ||  5–1 || T. Guilbeau (2–1) || I. Martinez (2–1) || T. Burrows (1) ||  1,735 || 8–5 || –
|- bgcolor="#ffbbbb"
| March 7 || Lipscomb || ||Hank Aaron Stadium || 3–7 || N. Andros (1–0) ||W. Carter (1–1) ||None ||2,270|| 8–6 ||–
|- bgcolor="#ccffcc"
| March 8|| Lipscomb || ||Hank Aaron Stadium || 3–0 || G. Bramblett (3–1) ||D. Norman (1–1) || T. Burrows (2)  ||1,807 || 9–6 ||–
|- bgcolor="#bbbbbb"
| March 10 ||  || ||Hoover Met ||  colspan=7 |Canceled
|- bgcolor="#bbbbbb"
| March 10 || Alabama A&M || ||Hoover Met ||  colspan=7 |Canceled
|- bgcolor="#ccffcc"
| March 14 || at #16  || ||Dudy Noble Field|| 10–5 || J. Hubbard (1–0) ||T. Fitts (1–2) || None  ||–|| 10–6 ||1–0
|- bgcolor="#ffbbbb"
| March 14 || at #16 Mississippi St. || ||Dudy Noble Field || 1–4 || A. Sexton (3–0) ||W. Carter (1–2) ||None ||8,634|| 10–7 ||1–1
|- bgcolor="#ccffcc"
| March 15 || at #16 Mississippi St. || ||Dudy Noble Field || 8–4 || R. Castillo (2–0) ||M. Gentry (0–1) || T. Burrows (3)  ||7,535|| 11–7 ||2–1
|- bgcolor="#ccffcc"
| March 17 ||  || ||Hoover Met || 8–6 || J. Walters (2–0) ||T. Widra (0–1) || T. Burrows (4)  ||2,701 || 12–7 ||–
|- bgcolor="#ffbbbb"
| March 20 ||#2   || ||Hoover Met || 2–4 || G. Long (5–0) || T. Guilbeau (2–2) || R. Hendrix (5) ||  2,701 || 12–8 || 2–2
|- bgcolor="#ffbbbb"
| March 21 ||#2 Texas A&M || ||Hoover Met || 5–10 || K. Simonds (6–0) || M. Greer (0–1) || None ||  – || 12–9 || 2–3
|- bgcolor="#ccffcc"
| March 21 ||#2 Texas A&M || ||Hoover Met || 6–2 || G. Bramblett (4–1) ||T. Larkins (2–1) || R. Castillo (3)  ||– || 13–9 ||3–3
|- bgcolor="#ffbbbb"
| March 24 || at || ||Eddie Stanky Field||  0–3 || A. Bembnowski (2–2) ||J. Walters (2–1)  || B. Taylor (2)  ||3,047 || 13–10 ||–
|- bgcolor="#ccffcc"
| March 27 || at #6  || ||McKethan Stadium || 12–9(10) || R. Castillo (3–0) ||T. Lewis (1–1) || None  || – || 14–10 ||4–3
|- bgcolor="#ffbbbb"
| March 27 || at #6 Florida || ||McKethan Stadium || 1–8 || L. Shore (4–2) ||W. Carter (1–3) ||None ||3,123|| 14–11 ||4–4
|- bgcolor="#ffbbbb"
| March 28 || at #6 Florida || ||McKethan Stadium||4–7 || A. Puk (5–2) ||J. Hubbard (2–2) || None ||4,367 || 14–12 ||4–5
|- bgcolor="#ccffcc"
| March 31 || at  || ||Regions Park || 7–2|| N. Eicholtz (1–0) ||T. Lowery (5–2) || None  || 3,226 || 15–12 ||–
|-

|- bgcolor="#ffbbbb"
|April 2 ||#5  || ||Hoover Met || 5–8(16) || D. Norman (2–1) ||J. Wilhite (0–1) || None  || 4,117 || 15–13 ||4–6
|- bgcolor="#ffbbbb"
|April 3 ||#5 LSU || ||Hoover Met || 2–6 || A. Lange (6–0) ||W. Carter (1–4) ||None ||3,963|| 15–14 ||4–7
|- bgcolor="#ffbbbb"
|April 4 ||#5 LSU|| ||Hoover Met || 4–6(13) || J. Stallings (1–1) || T. Burrows (0–3) || None ||  5,381 || 15–15 || 4–8
|- bgcolor="#ccffcc"
|April 7|| at || ||Griffin Stadium ||12–1 || J. Walters (3–1) ||E. Wright (2–3) || N. Eicholtz (1) ||1,023 || 16–15 ||–
|- bgcolor="#ccffcc"
|April 10 |||| ||Hoover Met || 7–6(11)|| M. Greer (1–1) ||J. Cheek (2–2) || None  || 3,247 || 17–15 ||5–8
|- bgcolor="#ffbbbb"
|April 11 ||Georgia|| ||Hoover Met|| 1–8 || R. Lawlor (4–4) ||W. Carter (1–5) ||None ||3,597|| 17–16 ||5–9
|- bgcolor="#ccffcc"
|April 12 ||Georgia|| ||Hoover Met|| 5–2 || G. Bramblett (5–1) ||J. Walsh (3–1) || J. Walters (1)  ||3,303 || 18–16 ||6–9
|- bgcolor="#ccffcc"
|April 14 |||| ||Hoover Met|| 5–1|| N. Eicholtz (2–0) ||D. Munger (0–1) || None  || 2,456 || 19–16 ||–
|- bgcolor="#ffbbbb"
|April 17 || at #17 Missouri|| ||Taylor Stadium || 3–4 || R. McClain (5–4) || T. Guilbeau (2–3) || B. Williams (9) ||  1,763 || 19–17 || 6–10
|- bgcolor="#ccffcc"
|April 18 || at #17 Missouri|| ||Taylor Stadium || 6–0 || J. Walters (4–1) ||T. Houck (6–2) || None ||612 || 20–17 ||7–10
|- bgcolor="#ffbbbb"
|April 19 || at #17 Missouri|| ||Taylor Stadium || 3–5 || A. Schwaab (2–0) ||G. Bramblett (5–2) || B. Williams (10) ||345 || 20–18 ||7–11
|- bgcolor="#ccffcc"
|April 21 |||| ||Hoover Met || 3–1|| N. Eicholtz (3–0) ||T. Case (3–7) || R. Castillo (4) || – || 21–18 ||–
|- bgcolor="#ccffcc"
|April 21 ||MS Valley State|| ||Hoover Met || 16–5 || W. Carter (2–5) ||B. Thomas (1–8) || None ||  2,413 || 22–18 ||–
|- bgcolor="#ffbbbb"
|April 25 ||at || ||Swayze Field || 2–10 || C. Trent (6–4) || T. Guilbeau (2–4) || None ||  8,042 || 22–19 || 7–12
|- bgcolor="#ffbbbb"
|April 25 || at Ole Miss || ||Swayze Field || 0–4 || B. Bramlett (5–2) ||J. Walters (4–2)  || S. Weathersby (3)  ||10,119 || 22–20 ||7–13
|- bgcolor="#ccffcc"
|April 26 || at Ole Miss|| ||Swayze Field || 13–4 || G. Bramblett (6–2) ||W. Stokes (1–5) || None  ||8,101 || 23–20 ||8–13
|- bgcolor="#ffbbbb"
|April 28 |||| ||Hoover Met || 2–6(7)|| C. Cockrell (3–0) ||N. Eicholtz (2–1) || None  || 2,354 || 23–21 ||–
|- bgcolor="#ffbbbb"
|April 30 ||#30  || ||Hoover Met|| 1–5 || T. Killian (2–3) || T. Guilbeau (2–5) || Z. Jackson (5) ||  2,602 || 23–22 || 8–14
|-

|- bgcolor="#ffbbbb"
|May 1 ||#30 || ||Hoover Met  ||  4–8 || J. Lowery (5–1) ||J. Walters (4–3)  || J. Teague (2)  ||3,343 || 23–23 ||8–15
|- bgcolor="#ffbbbb"
|May 2 ||#30 Arkansas || ||Hoover Met|| 0–4 || K. McKinney (4–1) ||G. Bramblett (6–3) || None ||3,413 || 23–24 ||8–16
|- bgcolor="#ccffcc"
| May 5 ||  || ||Hoover Met  ||7–2|| J. Shaw (1–0) ||D. Smith (2–6) || J. Wilhite (2) || – || 24–24 ||–
|- bgcolor="#ccffcc"
| May 5 || Alabama A&M || ||Hoover Met ||7–2|| A. Watkins (1–0) ||T. Knight (0–3) || None || 2,361 || 25–24 ||–
|- bgcolor="#ccffcc"
|May 8 || at || ||Plainsman Park || 4–2 || T. Burrows (1–3) ||T. Wingenter (1–5) || None  ||4,096 || 26–24 ||9–16
|- bgcolor="#ccffcc"
|May 9 || at Auburn || ||Plainsman Park  || 7–6|| J. Shaw (2–0) ||J. Camp (2–1) || T. Burrows (5) || 4,096 || 27–24 ||10–16
|- bgcolor="#ccffcc"
|May 10 || at Auburn || ||Plainsman Park || 14–4 || G. Bramblett (7–3) ||D. Rentz (3–2) || None  ||2,894 || 28–24 ||11–16
|- bgcolor="#ccffcc"
|May 12 ||  || ||Davis Stadium ||5–3 || W. Carter (3–5) ||D. Johnson (1–3) || None ||  2,569 || 29–24 ||–
|- bgcolor="#ffbbbb"
|May 14 ||#10  || ||Hoover Met|| 1–2 || C. Fulmer (11–1) || T. Guilbeau (2–6) || None ||  2,906 || 29–25 || 11–17
|- bgcolor="#ffbbbb"
|May 15 ||#10 Vanderbilt || ||Hoover Met ||5–7 || J. Sheffield (5–2) ||J. Walters (4–4)  || K. Wright (1)  ||3,515 || 29–26 ||11–18
|- bgcolor="#ccffcc"
|May 16 ||#10 Vanderbilt || ||Hoover Met || 1–0 || W. Carter (4–5) ||W. Buehler (3–2) || T. Burrows (6) || 3,684 || 30–26 ||12–18
|-

|-
! style="background:#FFF;color:#8B0000;"| Post-Season
|-

|- bgcolor="#ccffcc"
| May 19 || Ole Miss ||Hoover Met || 6–1 || G. Bramblett (8–3) ||S. Weathersby (4–2) || None  ||4,817|| 31–26 ||1–0
|- bgcolor="#ffbbbb"
|May 20 ||#8 Texas A&M || Hoover Met ||3–4 || R. Hendrix (5–2) ||R. Castillo (3–1)  || A. Vinson (4)  ||5,205|| 31–27 ||1–1
|- bgcolor="#ccffcc"
|May 21 ||Missouri || Hoover Met || 4–3 || T. Guilbeau (3–6) ||T. Houck (8–5) || T. Burrows (7) || 6,526|| 32–27 ||2–1
|- bgcolor="#ffbbbb"
|May 22 ||#7 Vanderbilt || Hoover Met ||1–16(7) || P. Pfeifer (4–4) ||W. Carter (4–6)  || None  ||10,329[|| 32–28 ||2–2
|-

† Indicates the game does not count toward the 2015 Southeastern Conference standings.
*Rankings are based on the team's current  ranking in the Collegiate Baseball poll.

Honors and awards
 Mikey White was selected as a Preseason Third Team All-American by Perfect Game USA.
 Mikey White was selected as a Preseason Second Team All-American by D1Baseball.

Rankings

See also
 2015 Alabama Crimson Tide softball team

References

Alabama
Alabama Crimson Tide baseball seasons
Alabama Crimson Tide baseball